Janet Akyüz Mattei (January 2, 1943 – March 22, 2004) was a Turkish-American astronomer who was the director of the American Association of Variable Star Observers (AAVSO) from 1973 to 2004.

Biography 
Mattei was born in Bodrum, Turkey to Bella and Baruh Akyüz, in a Turkish Jewish family and educated in the American Collegiate Institute, İzmir. She came to the United States for university studies, and attended Brandeis University in Waltham, MA on the Wien Scholarship. Later, she was offered a job by Dorrit Hoffleit at the Maria Mitchell Observatory in Nantucket, Massachusetts.

She worked at Leander McCormick Observatory in Charlottesville, Virginia from 1970 to 1972 and received her M.A. in Astronomy from the University of Virginia in 1972 and her Ph.D. in Astronomy from Ege University in Izmir, Turkey, 1982.

As head of the AAVSO for over 30 years, she collected observations of variable stars by amateur astronomers from around the world. She coordinated many important observing programs between amateur observers and professional astronomers. She was also keenly interested in education and student science projects. Under her direction, the database of the association was made available to educators and also assisted non-professional astronomers access the Hubble Space Telescope.

Awards and honors 
Mattei won many awards, including the Centennial Medal of the Société Astronomique de France, 1987; George Van Biesbroeck Prize, American Astronomical Society, 1993; Leslie Peltier Award, Astronomical League, 1993; first Giovanni Battista Lacchini Award for collaboration with amateur astronomers, Unione Astrofili Italiani, 1995; and the Jackson-Gwilt Medal of the Royal Astronomical Society, 1995. Asteroid 11695 Mattei was named in her honor on 9 January 2001.

Death 
She died of leukemia in Boston in March 2004.

References

External links 

 AAVSO website biography of Mattei
 Williams, Thomas R.; Willson, Lee Anne, Obituary: Janet Akyüz Mattei, 1943-2004 , The Smithsonian/NASA Astrophysics Data System.

1943 births
People from Bodrum
Turkish astronomers
Turkish Jews
American women astronomers
Turkish emigrants to the United States
Members of the Eurasian Astronomical Society
20th-century American  astronomers
21st-century American astronomers
Brandeis University alumni
University of Virginia alumni
2004 deaths
Deaths from leukemia
Deaths from cancer in Massachusetts
Ege University alumni
20th-century American women scientists